Bonewaldesthorne's Tower is a medieval structure on the northwest corner of the city walls of Chester, Cheshire, England; it is attached by a spur wall to the Water Tower.  It is recorded in the National Heritage List for England as a designated Grade I listed building.  Built as part of Chester's defensive system, it was used in the 19th and early 20th centuries as a museum.

History
The tower has been documented since 1249.  It was rebuilt or altered in 1322–26 when it became the gatehouse to the Water Tower.  The Chester Mechanics' Institution was founded in 1835.  The Institution wished to open a museum to show its artifacts and the city council leased the Water Tower and Bonewaldesthorne's Tower at a nominal rent for this purpose.  The museum opened in 1838.  A camera obscura was installed in the tower in 1840 and an observatory in 1848.  Around this time a statue of Queen Anne which had formerly been in the Exchange before it burned down was installed on the steps of the tower.

The Institution closed in 1876 and the exhibits came into the possession of the city council.  Although it was recognised that the tower was not suitable as a museum, there was at the time nowhere else to show all the exhibits.  The tower closed as a museum in 1901–02 while the city walls were rebuilt, and re-opened in 1903, attracting 12,000 visitors that season.  The towers were closed to the public in 1916 and in the 1920s they were let for non-museum use.  In 1954 they were bought by the Grosvenor Museum, which reopened them to the public in 1962. Bonewaldesthorne's Tower and the adjacent Water Tower have housed a museum of the history of medicine, 'Sick to Death', since August 2016.

Architecture
The plan of the tower is rectangular.  It is built in red sandstone coursed rubble and stands on a tall plinth.  Seven steps lead up from the walkway on the city walls to an arched doorway.  On the opposite side another doorway leads on to the spur wall to the Water Tower.  The top of the tower is battlemented.  Inside the tower is a fireplace and a closed staircase which is lit by a single slit window.

See also

Grade I listed buildings in Cheshire West and Chester

References

Buildings and structures in Chester
Grade I listed buildings in Chester
Grade I listed towers
Towers in Cheshire